Woody may refer to:

Biology
 Pertaining to wood, a plant tissue and material
 Woody plant, a plant with a rigid stem containing wood
 Pertaining to woodland, land covered with trees
 Woody, slang for a penile erection

People and fictional characters
 Woody (name), a list of people and fictional characters with the given name, nickname or surname
 Woody (singer), stage name of South Korean singer Kim Sang-woo (born 1992)
 DJ Woody (born 1977), British DJ and turntablist
 Woody (Toy Story), the main character in the Toy Story franchise

Places
 Woody, California, United States, an unincorporated community
 Woody, Texas, United States, a ghost town
 Woody Bay (disambiguation)
 Woody Gap, Georgia, United States
 Woody Island (disambiguation)
 Woody Point (disambiguation)

Other uses
 Woody, the working title of the British television sitcom SunTrap
 Woody, the codename of version 3.0 of the Debian Linux operating system
 The Woody, a fictional adult film award in the Family Guy episode "Brian Does Hollywood"

See also

 
 Wood (disambiguation)
 Woods (disambiguation)
 Woodie (disambiguation)
 Woodies (disambiguation)
 Woodrow (disambiguation)
 Woody's (disambiguation)
 Wu Di (disambiguation)
 Woody Woodpecker (disambiguation)